Dolbina formosana is a species of moth of the  family Sphingidae. It is known from Taiwan.

References

Dolbina
Moths described in 1927
Taxa named by Shōnen Matsumura